The Transandino pipeline is a  long crude oil pipeline, which transports oil from Orito, in the Department of Putumayo, to the Pacific port of Tumaco in the Department of Nariño, Colombia. There are four pump stations and four reduce pressure stations. It is operated by Ecopetrol.

References

Energy infrastructure completed in 1969
Oil pipelines in Colombia